Yana Peel (born June 1974) is a Canadian executive, businesswoman, children's author and philanthropist who is currently global head of arts and culture at Chanel. She was CEO of the Serpentine Galleries from 2016 to 2019, and was previously a board member.

Peel is a co-founder of the Outset Contemporary Art Fund (with Candida Gertler), and Intelligence Squared Asia, and was CEO of Intelligence Squared Group from 2013 to 2016.

Peel has several advisory positions including the Tate International Council, V-A-C Foundation, and the NSPCC therapeutic board. She has been an advisor to the British Fashion Council, Asia Art Archive, Lincoln Center, Para Site and the Victoria and Albert Museum, where she founded the design fund.

Early life

Yana Peel was born in June 1974 in Leningrad (now St. Petersburg), Russia. Her family emigrated to Canada via Austria in 1978.  She grew up in Toronto, Ontario.

Peel studied Russian studies at McGill University during the 1990s.  In 1996, while being a student she co-organised a fashion show for charity. After that, Peel undertook a post-graduate degree in economics at the London School of Economics. Peel was a member of the 2011 class of the World Economic Forum's Young Global Leaders programme.

Career

Goldman Sachs

Peel started her career in the equities division of Goldman Sachs in 1997 in London, and became an executive director before leaving in 2003.

Outset Contemporary Art Fund
Peel co-founded the charity Outset Contemporary Art Fund in 2003 with Candida Gertler. Peel and Gertler generated a model whereby artists could be presented to potential donors in order to raise funds to purchase their work, or to fund new commissions with a view to donating them to public institutions. The Fund purchased over 100 pieces for the Tate Modern, and commissioned work by artists including Francis Alys, Yael Bartana, Candice Breitz and Steve McQueen.

Intelligence Squared

In 2009, Peel co-founded Intelligence Squared Asia with Amelie Von Wedel, a not-for-profit platform for hosting live debates in Hong Kong. In 2012 Peel became CEO of Intelligence Squared Group, bringing the live events business out of its financial difficulties. Peel has hosted interviews including: Olafur Eliasson and Shirin Neshat at Davos, Ai Wei Wei at the Cambridge Union.

Serpentine Galleries

In April 2016, Peel was appointed to the role of CEO of the Serpentine Galleries. Peel said it was her "mission to create a safe space for unsafe ideas", and to promote a "socially conscious Serpentine". She indicated that she wanted to give artists a greater say in the development of the Serpentine Galleries, in order to give "artists a voice in the biggest global conversations". Peel worked in tandem with the artistic director, Hans Ulrich Obrist. 

Peel furthered the Serpentine Galleries' technological ambitions, introducing digital engagement initiatives including Serpentine Mobile Tours and the translation of the exhibition Zaha Hadid: Early Paintings and Drawings into virtual reality. Peel stated that she was "committed to maintaining and open-source spirit" at the Serpentine Galleries, and that it was her ambition "to inspire the widest audiences with the urgency of art and architecture". The Financial Times noted that Peel "has been able to lure companies such as Google and Bloomberg as partners to help meet the Serpentine's annual £9.5m target".

Peel and Obrist selected both the first African architect to work on a pavilion, and the youngest architect to do so. In 2018, she broadened the global reach of the Serpentine Pavilion programme by announcing the launch of a pavilion in Beijing designed by Sichuan practice, Jiakun Architects.

Together with Lord Richard Rogers and Sir David Adjaye, Peel and Obrist selected Burkina Faso architect Diébédo Francis Kéré to design the 2017 pavilion. The pavilion was awarded the Civic Trust Award in 2018. 

The Serpentine selected Mexican architect Frida Escobedo to design the 2018 pavilion. She will be the youngest architect to have participated in the Pavilion programme since it began in 2000.

Peel stepped down as CEO in June 2019 as a consequence of the attention paid to her alleged co-ownership of NSO Group. However, a later clarification published by The Guardian confirmed that Peel was not involved in the management, operations or control of NSO. Peel had a less than 10% ownership of Novalpina Capital, which subsequently acquired NSO in 2019. Peel was not personally involved in the operation or decisions of Novalpina Capital, which was managed by her husband.

Philanthropy
Peel co-chaired Para Site, a not-for-profit contemporary art space in Hong Kong, from 2010 to 2015. She has been involved with the project since 2009. 

Peel founded the Victoria and Albert Museum's design fund in 2011. The fund supported the acquisition of contemporary design objects. 

Peel is a member of NSPCC's therapeutic board. Inspired by her children, in 2008 Peel produced a series of toddler-friendly art books published by Templar, including: Art For Baby, Color For Baby and Faces For Baby. These books feature works by artists ranging from Damien Hirst to Keith Haring. Proceeds from the sales of the books go towards the NSPCC.

Personal life
In 1999, Peel married Stephen Peel, a private equity financier. They have two children and live in Bayswater, London.

Awards and honours
Montblanc Award for Arts Patronage 2011
Debrett's 500 List: Art
Evening Standard Progress 1000 2017
ArtLyst Power 100
Harper's Bazaar Women Of The Year 2017
Harper's Bazaar Working Wardrobe: Best dressed women 2018
Henry Crown Fellow. Appointed by the Aspen Institute in 2018.

References

1974 births
Living people
Alumni of the London School of Economics
British chief executives
British children's writers
British investors
British philanthropists
British women in business
British women writers
McGill University alumni
Businesspeople from Toronto
Henry Crown Fellows